In differential geometry, the Ricci curvature tensor, named after Gregorio Ricci-Curbastro, is a geometric object which is determined by a choice of Riemannian or pseudo-Riemannian metric on a manifold. It can be considered, broadly, as a measure of the degree to which the geometry of a given metric tensor differs locally from that of ordinary Euclidean space or pseudo-Euclidean space.

The Ricci tensor can be characterized by measurement of how a shape is deformed as one moves along geodesics in the space. In general relativity, which involves the pseudo-Riemannian setting, this is reflected by the presence of the Ricci tensor in the Raychaudhuri equation. Partly for this reason, the Einstein field equations propose that spacetime can be described by a pseudo-Riemannian metric, with a strikingly simple relationship between the Ricci tensor and the matter content of the universe.

Like the metric tensor, the Ricci tensor assigns to each tangent space of the manifold a symmetric bilinear form . Broadly, one could analogize the role of the Ricci curvature in Riemannian geometry to that of the Laplacian in the analysis of functions; in this analogy, the Riemann curvature tensor, of which the Ricci curvature is a natural by-product, would correspond to the full matrix of second derivatives of a function. However, there are other ways to draw the same analogy.

In three-dimensional topology, the Ricci tensor contains all of the information which in higher dimensions is encoded by the more complicated Riemann curvature tensor. In part, this simplicity allows for the application of many geometric and analytic tools, which led to the solution of the Poincaré conjecture through the work of Richard S. Hamilton and Grigory Perelman.

In differential geometry, lower bounds on the Ricci tensor on a Riemannian manifold allow one to extract global geometric and topological information by comparison (cf. comparison theorem) with the geometry of a constant curvature space form. This is since lower bounds on the Ricci tensor can be successfully used in studying the length functional in Riemannian geometry, as first shown in 1941 via Myers's theorem.

One common source of the Ricci tensor is that it arises whenever one commutes the covariant derivative with the tensor Laplacian. This, for instance, explains its presence in the Bochner formula, which is used ubiquitously in Riemannian geometry. For example, this formula explains why the gradient estimates due to Shing-Tung Yau (and their developments such as the Cheng-Yau and Li-Yau inequalities) nearly always depend on a lower bound for the Ricci curvature.

In 2007, John Lott, Karl-Theodor Sturm, and Cedric Villani demonstrated decisively that lower bounds on Ricci curvature can be understood entirely in terms of the metric space structure of a Riemannian manifold, together with its volume form. This established a deep link between Ricci curvature and Wasserstein geometry and optimal transport, which is presently the subject of much research.

Definition
Suppose that  is an -dimensional 
Riemannian or pseudo-Riemannian manifold, equipped 
with its Levi-Civita connection . The 
and returns the vector field 

on vector fields . The crucial property of this mapping 
fields such that  and  define the same element of 
 and  also define the same element 

The implication is that the Riemann curvature, which is a priori a mapping with 
vector field inputs and a vector field output, can actually be viewed as a mapping
with tangent vector inputs and a tangent vector output. That is, it defines for 
each point  a (multilinear) map:

Define for each point  the map  by

 of the vector space , one defines

where for any fixed , the numbers 
are the coordinates of  relative to 
the basis . It is a standard exercise of (multi)linear
algebra to verify that this definition does not depend on the choice of the basis 
.

Sign conventions. Note that some sources define  to be 
what would here be called  they would then define 
 as  
Although sign conventions differ about the Riemann tensor, they do not differ about 
the Ricci tensor.

Definition via local coordinates on a smooth manifold
Let  be a smooth Riemannian
or pseudo-Riemannian -manifold. 
Given a smooth chart  one then has functions
 and 
 for each 
 which satisfy

for all . The latter shows that, expressed as
matrices, .
The functions  are defined by evaluating  on 
coordinate vector fields, while the functions  are defined so
that, as a matrix-valued function, they provide an inverse to the matrix-valued 
function .

as maps .

Let  be the functions computed as above via the chart  and let  be the functions computed as above via the chart .
Then one can check by a calculation with the chain rule and the product rule that

where  is the first derivative along th direction
This shows that the following definition does not depend on the choice of 
.
For any , define a bilinear map 
 by

It is common to abbreviate the above formal presentation in the following style:

The final line includes the demonstration that the bilinear map Ric is well-defined, 
which is much easier to write out with the informal notation.

Comparison of the definitions
The two above definitions are identical. Arguably, the definitions directly using local coordinates are preferable, since the "crucial property" of the Riemann tensor mentioned above requires  to be Hausdorff in order to hold. By contrast, the local coordinate approach only requires a smooth atlas. It is also somewhat easier to connect the "invariance" philosophy underlying the local approach with the methods of constructing more exotic geometric objects, such as spinor fields.

The complicated formula defining  in the introductory section is the same as that in the following section. The only difference is that terms have been grouped so that it is easy to see that

Properties

As can be seen from the Bianchi identities,  the Ricci tensor of a Riemannian 
manifold is symmetric, in the sense that

for all  

It thus follows linear-algebraically that the Ricci tensor is completely determined 
by knowing the quantity  for all vectors 
 of unit length. This function on the set of unit tangent vectors 
is often also called the Ricci curvature, since knowing it is equivalent to 
knowing the Ricci curvature tensor.

The Ricci curvature is determined by the sectional curvatures of a Riemannian 
manifold, but generally contains less information. Indeed, if  is a 
vector of unit length on a Riemannian -manifold, then 
 is precisely 
times the average value of the sectional curvature, taken over all the 2-planes 
containing .  There is an -dimensional family 
of such 2-planes, and so only in dimensions 2 and 3 does the Ricci tensor determine 
the full curvature tensor. A notable exception is when the manifold is given a 
priori as a hypersurface of Euclidean space. The second fundamental form, 
which determines the full curvature via the Gauss–Codazzi equation, 
is itself determined by the Ricci tensor and the principal directions 
of the hypersurface are also the eigendirections of the Ricci tensor. The 
tensor was introduced by Ricci for this reason.

As can be seen from the second Bianchi identity, one has

where  is the scalar curvature, defined in local coordinates as  This is often called the contracted second Bianchi identity.

Informal properties
The Ricci curvature is sometimes thought of as (a negative multiple of) the 
Laplacian of the metric tensor .  Specifically, in harmonic local coordinates the components satisfy

where  is the Laplace–Beltrami operator,
here regarded  as acting on the locally-defined functions . 
This fact motivates, for instance, the introduction of the Ricci flow equation 
as a natural extension of the heat equation for the metric. Alternatively, 

Direct geometric meaning
Near any point  in a Riemannian manifold ,
one can define preferred local coordinates, called geodesic normal coordinates.
These are adapted to the metric so that geodesics through  correspond
to straight lines through the origin, in  such a manner that the geodesic distance
from  corresponds to the  Euclidean distance from the origin. 
In these coordinates, the metric tensor is well-approximated by the Euclidean 
metric, in the precise sense that

In fact, by taking the Taylor expansion of the metric applied to a Jacobi field along a radial geodesic in the normal coordinate system, one has

In these coordinates, the metric volume element then has the following expansion at :

which follows by expanding the square root of the determinant of the metric.

Thus, if the Ricci curvature  is positive
in the direction of a vector , the conical region in  
swept out by a tightly focused family of geodesic segments of length 
conical region in Euclidean space, at least provided that  
is sufficiently small. Similarly, if the Ricci curvature is negative in the 
direction of a given vector , such a conical region in the manifold 
will instead have larger volume than it would in Euclidean space.

The Ricci curvature is essentially an average of curvatures in the planes including
. Thus if a cone emitted with an initially circular (or spherical)
cross-section becomes distorted into an ellipse (ellipsoid), it is possible
for the volume distortion to vanish if the distortions along the 
principal axes counteract one another. The Ricci 
curvature would then vanish along . In physical applications, the 
presence of a nonvanishing sectional curvature does not necessarily indicate the
presence of any mass locally; if an initially circular cross-section of a cone 
of worldlines later becomes elliptical, without changing its volume, then 
this is due to tidal effects from a mass at some other location.

Applications 
Ricci curvature plays an important role in general relativity, where it is 
the key term in the Einstein field equations.

Ricci curvature  also appears in  the Ricci flow equation, where certain 
one-parameter families of Riemannian metrics are singled out as solutions of a 
geometrically-defined partial differential equation. This system of equations 
can be thought of as a geometric analog of the heat equation, and was first 
introduced by Richard S. Hamilton in 1982. Since heat tends to spread through 
a solid until the body reaches an equilibrium state of constant temperature, if 
one is given a manifold, the Ricci flow may be hoped to produce an 'equilibrium' 
Riemannian metric which is Einstein or of constant curvature. 
However, such a clean "convergence" picture cannot be achieved since many manifolds 
cannot support such metrics. A detailed study of the nature of solutions of the 
Ricci flow, due principally to Hamilton and Grigori Perelman, shows that the 
types of "singularities" that occur along a Ricci flow, corresponding to the 
failure of convergence, encodes deep information about 3-dimensional topology. 
The culmination of this work was a proof of the geometrization conjecture 
first proposed by William Thurston in the 1970s, which can be thought of as 
a classification of compact 3-manifolds.

On a Kähler manifold, the  Ricci curvature determines the first Chern class 
of the manifold (mod torsion). However, the Ricci curvature has no analogous 
topological interpretation on a generic Riemannian manifold.

Global geometry and topology
Here is a short list of global results concerning manifolds with positive Ricci curvature; see also classical theorems of Riemannian geometry. Briefly, positive Ricci curvature of a Riemannian manifold has strong topological consequences, while (for dimension at least 3), negative Ricci curvature has no topological implications. (The Ricci curvature is said to be positive if the Ricci curvature function  is positive on the set of non-zero tangent vectors .)  Some results are also known for pseudo-Riemannian manifolds.

By a covering-space argument, it follows that any compact manifold of positive Ricci curvature must have finite fundamental group. Cheng (1975) showed that, in this setting, equality in the diameter inequality occurs if only if the manifold is isometric to a sphere of a constant curvature .
The Bishop–Gromov inequality states that if a complete -dimensional Riemannian manifold has non-negative Ricci curvature, then the volume of a geodesic ball is less than or equal to the volume of a geodesic ball of the same radius in Euclidean -space. Moreover, if  denotes the volume of the ball with center  and radius  in the manifold and  denotes the volume of the ball of radius  in Euclidean -space then the function  is nonincreasing. This can be generalized to any lower bound on the Ricci curvature (not just nonnegativity), and is the key point in the proof of Gromov's compactness theorem.)
The Cheeger–Gromoll splitting theorem states that if a complete Riemannian manifold  with  contains a line, meaning a geodesic   such that  for all , then it is isometric to a product space . Consequently, a complete manifold of positive Ricci curvature can have at most one topological end.  The theorem is also true  under some additional hypotheses for complete Lorentzian manifolds (of metric  signature ) with non-negative Ricci tensor.
Hamilton's first convergence theorem for Ricci flow has, as a corollary, that the only compact 3-manifolds which have Riemannian metrics of  positive Ricci curvature are the quotients of the 3-sphere by discrete subgroups  of SO(4) which act properly discontinuously. He later extended this to allow for  nonnegative Ricci curvature. In particular, the only simply-connected possibility  is the 3-sphere itself.
These results, particularly Myers' and Hamilton's, show that positive Ricci curvature has strong topological consequences. By contrast, excluding the case of surfaces, negative Ricci curvature is now known to have no topological implications;  has shown that any manifold of dimension greater than two admits a complete Riemannian metric of negative Ricci curvature. In the case of two-dimensional manifolds, negativity of the Ricci curvature is synonymous with negativity of the Gaussian curvature, which has very clear topological implications. There are very few two-dimensional manifolds which fail to admit Riemannian metrics of negative Gaussian curvature.

Behavior under conformal rescaling 
If the metric  is changed by multiplying it by a conformal factor 
, the Ricci tensor of the new, conformally-related metric 
 is given   by

where  is the (positive spectrum) Hodge Laplacian, i.e., 
the opposite of the usual trace of the Hessian.

In particular, given a point  in a Riemannian manifold, it is always 
possible to find metrics conformal to the given metric  for which the 
Note, however, that this is only pointwise 
assertion; it is usually impossible to make the Ricci curvature vanish identically 
on the entire manifold by a conformal rescaling.

For two dimensional manifolds, the above formula shows that if  is a 
harmonic function, then the conformal scaling  
does not change the Ricci tensor (although it still changes its trace with respect 
to the metric unless .

Trace-free Ricci tensor
In Riemannian geometry and pseudo-Riemannian geometry, the 
trace-free Ricci tensor (also called traceless Ricci tensor) of a 
Riemannian or pseudo-Riemannian -manifold  
is the tensor defined by

where  and  denote the Ricci curvature 
The name of this object reflects the 
fact that its trace automatically vanishes: 
 However, it is quite an 
important tensor since it reflects an "orthogonal decomposition" of the Ricci tensor.

The orthogonal decomposition of the Ricci tensor 
The following, not so trivial, property is

It is less immediately obvious that the two terms on the right hand side are orthogonal 
to each other:

An identity which is intimately connected with this (but which could be proved directly) 
is that

The trace-free Ricci tensor and Einstein metrics
By taking a divergence, and using the contracted Bianchi identity, one sees that 
 implies . 
of  implies that the scalar curvature is constant. One can then see 
that the following are equivalent:

 
  for some number 
 

In the Riemannian setting, the above orthogonal decomposition shows that 
 is also equivalent to these conditions. 
In the pseudo-Riemmannian setting, by contrast, the condition  
does not necessarily imply  so the most that one can say is that 
these conditions imply 

In particular, the vanishing of trace-free Ricci tensor characterizes 
Einstein manifolds, as defined by the condition  
for a number  In general relativity, this equation states 
that  is a solution of Einstein's vacuum field 
equations with cosmological constant.

Kähler manifolds
On a Kähler manifold , the Ricci curvature determines the 
curvature form of the canonical line bundle 
.  The canonical line bundle is the top 
exterior power of the bundle of holomorphic Kähler differentials:

The Levi-Civita connection corresponding to the metric on  gives 
The curvature of this connection is 
the 2-form defined by 

where  is the complex structure map on the 
tangent bundle determined by the structure of the Kähler manifold. The Ricci 
form is a closed 2-form. Its cohomology class is, 
up to a real constant factor, the first Chern class of the canonical bundle, 
homotopy class of the complex structure.

Conversely, the Ricci form determines the Ricci tensor by

In local holomorphic coordinates , the Ricci form is given by

where  is the Dolbeault operator and

If the Ricci tensor vanishes, then the canonical bundle is flat, so the 
structure group can be locally reduced to a subgroup of the 
special linear group .  However, Kähler manifolds 
Conversely, if the (restricted) holonomy of a 2-dimensional Riemannian 
Kähler manifold .

Generalization to affine connections
The Ricci tensor can also be generalized to arbitrary affine connections, 
where it is an invariant that plays an especially important role in the study of 
projective geometry (geometry associated to 
unparameterized geodesics) .  If  
denotes an affine connection, then the curvature tensor  is the 
(1,3)-tensor defined by

for any vector fields . The Ricci tensor is defined to be the trace:

In this more general situation, the Ricci tensor is symmetric if and only if there 
exists locally a parallel volume form for the connection.

Discrete Ricci curvature 
Notions of Ricci curvature on discrete manifolds have been defined on graphs and
networks, where they quantify local divergence properties of edges. Ollivier's 
Ricci curvature is defined using optimal transport theory. 
A different (and earlier) notion, Forman's Ricci curvature, is based on 
topological arguments.

See also

Curvature of Riemannian manifolds
Scalar curvature
Ricci calculus
Ricci decomposition
Ricci-flat manifold
Christoffel symbols
Introduction to the mathematics of general relativity

Footnotes

References
.
.
.
Forman (2003), "Bochner's Method for Cell Complexes and Combinatorial Ricci Curvature", Discrete & Computational Geometry, 29 (3): 323–374. doi:10.1007/s00454-002-0743-x. ISSN 1432-0444
.
.
.
.

.
Ollivier, Yann (2009), "Ricci curvature of Markov chains on metric spaces", Journal of Functional Analysis 256 (3): 810–864. doi:10.1016/j.jfa.2008.11.001. ISSN 0022-1236
.

Najman, Laurent and Romon, Pascal (2017): Modern approaches to discrete curvature, Springer (Cham), Lecture notes in mathematics

External links
Z. Shen, C. Sormani "The Topology of Open Manifolds with Nonnegative Ricci Curvature" (a survey)
G. Wei, "Manifolds with A Lower Ricci Curvature Bound" (a survey)

Curvature (mathematics)
Differential geometry
Riemannian geometry
Riemannian manifolds
Tensors in general relativity